Askia Nuh was a ruler of the Dendi Kingdom, the rump state of the Songhai Empire. He was a son of Askia Dawud and established his capital at Lulami, from where Songhai resistance to the Saadi Moroccans continued.

Conflict with the Saadi dynasty
Askia Nuh resisted the invasion of the Moroccan Pasha, Mahmud ibn Zarqun, by costly warfare lasting two years. In 1594 Mahmud was forced to cease the conflict and retreated, but was killed in the same year by the Dogon people, probably allies of Askia Nuh. 

The new pasha called Mansur continued the war against Dendi Kingdom and Nuh adopted guerilla warfare once again. This state of affairs lasted until 1599, when Nuh's followers became tired of the war and deposed him in favor of his brother Harun.

References

Sources
 

People of the Songhai Empire
16th-century monarchs in Africa